Mullinahone-CJ Kickhams GAA  is a Gaelic Athletic Association located in Mullinahone, south County Tipperary, Ireland, close to the border with County Kilkenny. The Mullinahone Club is named in honour of Charles J. Kickham, "Poet and Patriot", who was born in the village.

History
The Kickhams Club has, for most of its existence - spanning over 120 years - been a traditional Gaelic football club, winning many county senior football championships in the early part of the 20th century. Hurling enjoyed a resurgence in the 1990s, culminating with victory in the County Senior Hurling Championship in 2002.
The senior hurling team has challenged for honours every year since their golden year.

Honours
Tipperary Senior Football Championship (4)
 1912, 1913, 1926, 1929
South Tipperary Senior Football Championship (6)
 1913, 1916, 1919, 1926, 1929, 1945
Mid Tipperary Senior Football Championship (2)
 1917, 1930
 Tipperary Senior Hurling Championship  (1)
 2002
 Séamus Ó Riain Cup (1)
 2020
South Tipperary Senior Hurling Championship (14)
 1993, 1995, 1997, 1999, 2002, 2003, 2004, 2006, 2009, 2011, 2012, 2014, 2016, 2019
Tipperary Intermediate Football Championship (3)
 2000, 2006, 2011
Munster Intermediate Club Football Championship Runners-up
2011
South Tipperary Intermediate Football Championship (7)
 1965, 1989, 1996, 2000, 2005, 2011, 2015
South Tipperary Intermediate Hurling Championship (2) 
 1990, 1991
Tipperary Junior Football Championship (3)
 1916, 1973, 2019
Munster Junior Club Football Championship Runners-up
2019South Tipperary Junior Football Championship (4)
 1961, 1972, 1973, 2018South Tipperary Junior B Football Championship (1)
 2010Tipperary Junior A Hurling Championship (1)
 1989South Tipperary Junior Hurling Championship (4) 
 1940, 1979, 1985, 1989 South Tipperary Junior B Hurling Championship (5)
 2002, 2009, 2015, 2017, 2018South Tipperary Under-21 Football Championship (2)
 1970 (with St. Patrick's, as Slievenamon), 1978 (with Killenaule as Young Irelands)Tipperary Under-21 B Football Championship (2)
 1988, 2008South Tipperary Under-21 B Football Championship (5)
 1988, 1996, 2001, 2008, 2010Tipperary Under-21 Hurling Championship (1)
 1989South Tipperary Under-21 Hurling Championship (7)
 1976(with Killenaule as Young Irelands), 1978 (with Killenaule as Young Irelands), 1979 (with Killenaule as Eire Og), 1980 (with Killenaule as Eire Og), 1989, 1996 (as Mullinahone Gaels), 1999Tipperary Under-21 B Hurling Championship (2)
 1988, 2008South Tipperary Under-21 B Hurling Championship (4)
 1988, 2005, 2006, 2008South Tipperary Minor Football Championship (3)
 1956, 1970 (with St. Patrick's, as Slievenamon), 1977 (with Killenaule as Young Irelands)Tipperary Minor B Football Championship (1)
 2006South Tipperary Minor B Football Championship  (4)
 1996, 2000, 2006, 2018Tipperary Minor Hurling Championship (1)
 2011South Tipperary Minor hurling Championship (6)
 1960 (with Ballingarry), 1962 (with Ballingarry), 1963 (with Ballingarry), 1996, 2011, 2019South Tipperary Minor B Hurling Championship''' (3)
 1990, 2004, 2018

Notable players
 Eoin Kelly - who was a member of the Tipperary team that won the All-Ireland Senior Hurling Championship in 2001, and who captained Tipperary to its next win in 2010.
 Paul Kelly
 John Leahy

References

External links
Tipperary GAA site

Gaelic games clubs in County Tipperary
Gaelic football clubs in County Tipperary
Hurling clubs in County Tipperary